Bouchercon is an annual convention of creators and devotees of mystery and detective fiction. It is named in honour of writer, reviewer, and editor Anthony Boucher; it is also the inspiration for the Anthony Awards, which have been issued at the convention since 1986. This page details Bouchercon XXX and the 14th Anthony Awards ceremony.

Bouchercon
The convention was held in Milwaukee, Wisconsin on September 30, 1999; running until October 3. The event was chaired by author Ted Hertel, and non-fiction author Gary Warren Niebuhr.

Special Guests
Lifetime Achievement awards — Len & June Moffatt
Guest of Honor — Max Allan Collins
International Guest of Honor — Reginald Hill
Fan Guests of Honor — Beverly DeWeese and Maggie Mason
Toastmaster — Parnell Hall

Anthony Awards
The following list details the awards distributed at the fourteenth annual Anthony Awards ceremony.

Novel award
Winner:
Michael Connelly, Blood Work

Shortlist:
Nevada Barr, Blind Descent
Reginald Hill, On Beulah Height
Dennis Lehane, Gone, Baby, Gone
Aileen Schumacher, Framework for Death

First novel award
Winner:
William Kent Krueger, Iron Lake

Shortlist:
Jerrilyn Farmer, Sympathy for the Devil
Jacqueline Fiedler, Tiger's Palette
Steve Hamilton, A Cold Day in Paradise
Donald Harstad, Eleven Days

Paperback original award
Winner:
 Laura Lippman, Butchers Hill

Shortlist:
 Sujata Massey, Zen Attitude
 Rick Riordan, Widower's Two-Step
 Caroline Roe, Remedy for Treason
 Steven Womack, Murder Manual

Short story award
Winner:
Barbara D'Amato, "Of Course You Know that Chocolate is a Vegetable", from Ellery Queen's Mystery Magazine November 1998

Shortlist:
Jan Burke, "Two Bits", from Ellery Queen's Mystery Magazine May 1998
Harlan Coben, "A Simple Philosophy", from Malice Domestic 7
Rick Riordan, "A Small Silver Gun", from Mary Higgins Clark Mystery Magazine
Peter Robinson, "The Two Ladies of Rose Cottage", from Not Safe After Dark

Critical / Non-fiction award
Winner:
George Easter, Deadly Pleasures

Shortlist:
Alzina Stone Dale, Mystery Reader's Walking Guide: Washington, D.C.
Eddie Muller, Dark City: The Lost World of Film Noir
Victoria Nichols & Susan Thompson, Silk Stalkings: More Women Write of Murder
Robin Winks & Maureen Corrigan, Mystery And Suspense writers: The Literature of Crime, Detection, and Espionage

References

Anthony Awards
30
1999 in Wisconsin